Grettel Barboza (born September 6, 1956 in San José) is a Costa Rican sport shooter. She has been selected to compete for Costa Rica at the 2004 Summer Olympics, finishing thirty-fifth in the air pistol.

Barboza qualified as the 47-year-old lone shooter for the Costa Rican squad in the women's 10 m air pistol at the 2004 Summer Olympics in Athens. She had been granted an Olympic invitation for her country by ISSF and IOC, having registered a minimum qualifying score of 367 at the ISSF World Cup meet in Atlanta, Georgia, United States three years earlier. Barboza fired a lowly 368 out of a possible 400 to force a three-way tie with her fellow Latin American markswomen Amanda Mondol of Colombia and triple Olympian Margarita Tarradell of Cuba for thirty-fifth place in the qualifying round, failing to advance further to the final.

References

External links

1956 births
Living people
Costa Rican female sport shooters
Olympic shooters of Costa Rica
Shooters at the 2004 Summer Olympics
People from San José, Costa Rica